Uzdol is a village in Prozor-Rama municipality, Bosnia-Herzegovina. According to the census of 1991, the village has a total of 484 people with 483 Croats (99.79%) and 1 Others (00.21%).

Demographics 
According to the 2013 census, its population was 247.

See also
 Uzdol massacre

References

External links
 Satellite image

Populated places in Prozor-Rama